Mist is a novel written by Miguel de Unamuno in 1907 and first published in 1914 by Editorial Renacimiento.

Entitled as Fog. A novel in a translation by Elena Barcia published by Northwestern University Press in 2017.

Plot summary
The plot revolves around the character of Augusto, a wealthy, intellectual and introverted young man. He falls in love with a young woman named Eugenia as she walks past him on the street, and he sets about trying to court her. He is aided in his efforts by the other members of Eugenia's household. Her Aunt Ermelinda is particularly keen for a relationship to evolve, so that Augusto might help with her niece's financial troubles. Nevertheless, Eugenia rejects his advances, since she is already in a relationship with the down-and-out Mauricio. Augusto pays off Eugenia's mortgage as a goodwill gesture without her knowing, but this only serves to insult Eugenia, rather than endear him to her.

In the meantime, Augusto becomes involved with another girl, Rosario, and he begins to question if he is really in love with Eugenia at all. After talking with various friends and acquaintances, Augusto decides he will propose to Eugenia in any case. To his surprise, Eugenia accepts the engagement. A few days before the marriage is to occur, Augusto receives a letter from Eugenia. The letter explained that she was leaving him for Mauricio.   Augusto, heartbroken, decides to kill himself.  

Because everything Augusto does involves a lengthy thought process, he decides that he needs to consult Unamuno himself (the author of the novel), who had written an article on suicide which Augusto had read.  When Augusto speaks with Unamuno, the truth is revealed that Augusto is actually a fictional character whom Unamuno has created.  Augusto is not real, Unamuno explains, and for that reason cannot kill himself.  Augusto asserts that he exists, even though he acknowledges internally that he doesn't, and threatens Unamuno by telling him that he is not the ultimate author.  Augusto reminds Unamuno that he might be just a character in one of God's dreams.  Augusto returns to his home and dies.

Whether or not he is killed by Unamuno or commits suicide is a subject of debate and is mostly down to the reader's opinion. The book ends with the author himself debating himself about bringing back the character of Augusto. He establishes, however, that this would not be feasible. The eulogy is given by Orfeo, Augusto's dog.

The title, Spanish for 'fog', is a reference to how Augusto sees his life. Augusto describes his world as full of small and almost imperceptible occurrences, some of them good, some of them bad, that all serve to obscure his vision.

Characters 
Augusto Pérez: main character.

Víctor Goti: Augusto's best friend.

Miguel de Unamuno: renowned Spanish writer whom Augusto decides to visit when in search of life advises.

Eugenia Domingo Del Arco: piano instructor and acquaintance of Augusto.

Mauricio: Eugenia's lover. He is also a friend for Rosario.

Rosario: young woman who brings the ironed clothes to Augusto's house.

Orfeo: Augusto's dog.

Domingo:​ Augusto's house steward. 

Liduvina: Augusto's housekeeper.

Ermelinda: Eugenia's aunt.

Margarita: Eugenia's uncles' house caretaker.

Movie adaptations 

 Niebla (1965), Spanish Television miniseries directed by Pedro Amalio López.
 Niebla (1976), Spanish Television telefilm directed by Fernando Méndez-Leite.
 Las cuatro novias de Augusto Pérez (1976), Spanish film by José Jara.

Discussions 
Unamuno scholars such as J.A.G. Ardila, have contended that Mist was inspired by the Danish philosopher Søren Kierkegaard's work Diary of a Seducer, a novella in Either/Or.

External links
"Mist, a Renaissance "Nivola" by Unamuno". Exploring your mind. 2020-04-16. Retrieved 2022-10-17.

References

1907 novels
1914 novels
Adaptations of works by Søren Kierkegaard
Novels by Miguel de Unamuno
Metafictional novels
Modernist novels